Penile is a historic community located in Jefferson County, Kentucky, United States.  Formerly an unincorporated community, it was designated a neighborhood of Louisville, Kentucky when the city merged with Jefferson County in 2003.

Penile is pronounced by locals as Pa-nilē. The most prominent sights in Penile are a cemetery and Penile Baptist Church.

References

Neighborhoods in Louisville, Kentucky